"Humpty Dumpty Heart", also known as "(I've Got A) Humpty Dumpty Heart", is a country music song written and sung by Hank Thompson (with backing from His Brazos Valley Boys) and released on the Capitol label. In January 1948, it reached No. 3 on the Billboard folk juke box charts. It was also ranked as the No. 6 record on Billboard's 1948 year-end folk record sellers chart.

There are at least two other popular songs titled "Humpty Dumpty Heart"
 "Humpty Dumpty Heart" written by Johnny Burke and Jimmy Van Heusen song was recorded by Bing Crosby, the Glenn Miller Orchestra, and Kay Kyser, among others.
 "Humpty Dumpty Heart" written by Henry Boye was recorded by LaVern Baker.

References

Hank Thompson (musician) songs
1948 songs